Sundnes Brenneri is a Norwegian potato processing plant and distillery located in Inderøy. It produces akvavit, potato chips, potato starch flour and mashed potatoes. The plant was started in 1844, four years before private distillation was banned. It is part of the HOFF Norske Potetindustrier agricultural cooperative.

The akvavit production was covered by the import of caraway from Eastern Europe until 1989 when farmers in Inderøy started caraway production. Today half a square kilometer of caraway is produced in the municipality. The potato for the akvavit has always been locally produced.

References

Food and drink companies of Norway
Companies based in Trøndelag
Inderøy
Companies established in 1844
Food and drink companies established in 1844